Ulsan Station (Tongdosa) is a South Korean high-speed rail station located in Samnam-eup, Ulju-gun. It is on Gyeongbu High Speed Railway and named Ulsan Station with subname Tongdosa, which is located in Yangsan, nearer than downtown Ulsan from the station. The existing Ulsan Station in Samsan-Dong, Nam-gu has been renamed to Taehwagang station.

History 
The Ulsan Station had not planned for second phase of Gyeongbu HSR, although Ulsan is one of the metropolitan cities. But with constant civil petitions, President Roh Moo-hyun appealed positive reaction, and the station was added to the plan from November 14, 2003. In result, it became the most successful case of second phase of Gyeongbu HSR.

Subname dispute 

The subname of Ulsan Station is Tongdosa, the temple located in Yangsan, not Ulsan. Some Christians didn't agree with the subname, arguing that it is a religious problem. But the Korail made a vote, resulted 7 of 9 committee agreed with the 'Tongdosa' subname. Nonetheless, the subname had not been displayed in the station until 2012.

Station layout

See also 
 KTX
 Transportation in South Korea

References

External links

Railway stations in Ulsan
Ulju County
Korea Train Express stations
Railway stations opened in 2010